Six warships of Sweden have been named Södermanland, after Södermanland:

, a warship launched in 1651.
, a warship launched in 1693.
, a galley launched in 1749.
, a warship launched in 1750.
, a  launched in 1956 and stricken in 1982.
, a  launched in 1988 and since in active service.

Swedish Navy ship names